Patrick Howard Fraley (born February 18, 1949) is an American voice actor and voice-over teacher, known as the voice of Krang, Casey Jones, Baxter Stockman and numerous other characters in the 1987 Teenage Mutant Ninja Turtles animated television series and voiced Falcon in the 2003 Stuart Little animated television series. Fraley is also a member of Voice and Speech Trainers of America.

Career

His first role was in 1979, in Hanna-Barbera's Scooby Goes Hollywood where he supplied additional voices.

In 1985, he voiced Ace on G.I. Joe: A Real American Hero and Hillbilly Jim on Hulk Hogan's Rock 'n' Wrestling. He played Slick the Turtle on ABC's The Littles. He later did the voices of Coach Frogface and Sludge on Galaxy High School.

A versatile voice artist in 1987, Fraley voiced 65 characters on the animated TV series Teenage Mutant Ninja Turtles: Al, Aleister, Army Colonel, Antrax, Billy Jim Bob McJames, Bubba Badd, Bully, Chakahachi, Clown, Dr. Davens, Electrozapper, Erik/Erk  Krang, Casey Jones, Cheese shop owner, Dippy, Dirtbag, Baxter Stockman, Barney Stockman, Fourth Goon, Gas station worker, The Great Boldini, Jewelry store salesman, Joey, Hans, Zak the Nutrino, Granitor, Burne Thompson, Kazuo Saki, Library security guard, Maitre'd, Malathor, Man with cotton candy, Mr. Reilly, Napoleon Bonafrog, Nasty Krangazoid, Obento, Rich man, Police chief, Policeman, Professor Mindbender, Raptor, Ray, Rich Man Rodney's butler, Rudy, Sailor, Scaredy Krangazoid, Scumbug, Seymour/Security guard, Second Viking, Short criminal, Sergeant O'Flaherty, Shogun, Slash, Smarty Krangazoid, Subway policeman, Third Goon, Titanus, Turtle cab driver, Wally cleaver, and Vernon Fenwick.

In the 1980s and 1990s he appeared in guest roles on animated series such as Denver, the Last Dinosaur, Garfield and Friends, The Twisted Tales of Felix the Cat, Little Clowns of Happytown, The New Yogi Bear Show, Filmation's Ghostbusters, Goof Troop, Bonkers, Gargoyles, Yo Yogi!, Batman: The Animated Series, Bobby's World, The Tick,  James Bond Jr., The Mask: The Animated Series, The Little Mermaid, and The Angry Beavers.

Pat voiced the title character in BraveStarr,  Fireball in Saber Rider and the Star Sheriffs, Cousin Itt in The Addams Family, Max Ray in Ruby Spears' The Centurions, Lurky, Buddy Blue, On-X and Evil Force in Rainbow Brite, young Scrooge McDuck and Sir Guy Standforth in DuckTales, Gwumpki in Quack Pack, Sniff in Space Cats and as Wildcat in TaleSpin. He also voiced Kyle the Cat on The Tom and Jerry Kids Show and lead character, Marshal Moo Montana in Wild West C.O.W.-Boys of Moo Mesa as well as Tuffy Smurf in The Smurfs.

In 2004, Fraley appeared on Nickelodeon's My Life as a Teenage Robot and ChalkZone. The following year, he had a minor role in Disney's animated film The Wild and also voiced Fred's uncle Karl on an episode of What's New, Scooby-Doo?. He also had a role on camera as Mr. Harris in 'Til Death and did voices in the two live-action films The High Crusade and The Fisher King.

In 2007, Fraley made his live-action voice role debut in the post-apocalyptic science fiction horror film I Am Legend where he voiced the President of the United States.

Fraley substituted for Tim Allen in the early years as the voice of Buzz Lightyear in various video and computer games, merchandise, attractions, and the Disney On Ice Disneyland Adventure.

He has voiced roles in Toy Story 2, Monsters, Inc., Chicken Little, Tangled, and Happy Feet Two and performed ADR work for films such as The Muppets and Lincoln.

Personal life
Fraley has been married to his wife Renee Zimmerman since 1979; together they have four children.

He grew up in the Mormon faith but became a born-again Christian later in life. He lives in Hollywood, California. He is good friends with fellow actors Ed Asner and Brad Garrett.

He holds an MFA degree in Acting from Cornell University.

Filmography

Film

BraveStarr: The Movie - Marshal BraveStarr, Thunderstick
Casper's Scare School – Narrator, Scare Center Hosts, Werewolf, Wolfie
Charlotte's Web 2: Wilbur's Great Adventure – Donkey
Chicken Little – Additional voices
Crab Cove – Colonel Crab, Salty Seagull
Elysium – Oz, Gramps
Garfield Gets Real – Sid, Deliverly Gnome
Gargoyles the Movie: The Heroes Awaken – Brendan
Happy Feet Two – Additional voices
Here Comes Peter Cottontail: The Movie – Chipmunk, Dad Mouse, Hawk
Monsters, Inc. – Blobby, Ricky Plesuski
Nine Dog Christmas – Santa, Number 2 Elf
Porco Rosso – Bellini
Puss in Boots - ADR group
Princess Mononoke – Additional voices
Rainbow Brite and the Star Stealer – Lurky, On-X, Buddy Blue, Dog, Guard, Spectran, Slurthie, Glitterbot
Rockin' with Judy Jetson – Zilchy
Scooby Goes Hollywood – Brother, Guard, Announcer's Voice
Tales from Earthsea – Weapon Salesman, Advisor #2
Tangled – Additional voices
The Adventures of the American Rabbit - Tini Meeny
The Ant Bully – Ant Council #1
The Boxtrolls – Fragile, Sweets
The GLO Friends Save Christmas
The Good, the Bad, and Huckleberry Hound – Additional voices 
The Snow Queen 2 – Rakhat
The Wild – Additional voices
Toy Story 2 – Additional Buzz Lightyears
What's New, Scooby-Doo? – Uncle Karl
W.I.T.C.H – Marco
Yogi's Great Escape – Reporter, Cowboy Kid #1, Swamp Fox Kid

Television

Adventures of the Gummi Bears – Additional voices
Aladdin – Additional voices
Alvin and the Chipmunks – Additional voices
Barnyard Commandos – Additional voices
Batman: The Animated Series – Bat-Mite, Jest
Bigfoot and the Muscle Machines - Additional voices
Biker Mice from Mars – Additional voices
Bill & Ted's Excellent Adventures – Additional voices
Blondie and Dagwood – Daisy Bumstead
Blondie & Dagwood: Second Wedding Workout – Daisy Bumstead
Bobby's World – Meeker
Bonkers – Bucky Buzzsaw, Ma's Henchman, Toon Microphone Boom
BraveStarr – Marshall Bravestarr, Thunderstick, Cactus Head, Additional voices
The Brothers Flub – Additional voices
Bubsy – Arnold Armadillo, Virgil Reality
Camp Candy – Additional voices
The Spooktacular New Adventures of Casper – Logical, Order
CBS Storybreak - Additional voices
ChalkZone – Flatso, Jackie, Slippy, Genie, Big Toe Man, Mamma Bunny, Ken Spark
Cow and Chicken – Announcer #2, Cop
Crayon Shin-chan (Vitello dub) – Various characters
Darkwing Duck – Additional voices
Defenders of Dynatron City – Jeff Headstrong
Denver, the Last Dinosaur – Denver
Droopy, Master Detective – The Yolker
DuckTales – Sir Guy Standforth, Young Scrooge McDuck
Extreme Ghostbusters – Additional voices
Fantastic Max – Additional voices
Filmation's Ghostbusters – Jake Kong, Jr., additional voices
G.I. Joe: A Real American Hero – Ace, Barbecue, Wild Weasel
Galaxy High School – Coach Frogface
Galtar and the Golden Lance – Additional voices
Garfield and Friends – Additional voices
Gargoyles – Brendan, Jogger
Goof Troop – Wally
Hanazuki: Full of Treasures – Doughy Bunington
Hulk Hogan's Rock 'n' Wrestling – Hillbilly Jim
Invasion America – Additional voices
It's Punky Brewster – Additional voices
Jackie and the Next-Neighbor Girls – Meeker
James Bond Jr. – Additional voices
Jason and the Heroes of Mount Olympus – Hercules
King of the Hill – Customer
Kissyfur – Additional voices
Lazer Tag Academy – Charlie Ferguson, Skugs
Level Up – Insect Slug
Little Clowns of Happytown – Awful BeBad, Geek & Whiner
Lucky Luke – Additional voices
Men in Black: The Animated Series – Stadium Janitor, Bob the Twin, Worm Guys
Midnight Patrol: Adventures in the Dream Zone – Additional voices
Muppet Babies – Additional voices
Mr. Bogus – Dad, Molie
My Life as a Teenage Robot – Santa Claus, Captain, Skeeves
My Little Pony and Friends – Additional voices
New Kids on the Block – Additional voices
Ozzy & Drix – Brain Advisor, Pnemoniac, Nerve Cell General
Paw Paws – Additional voices
Potsworth & Co. – Additional voices
Pound Puppies – Sherlock Bones, Mouseketter 1, Pupnik, Fleaco, Santa Claus, Yapper
Problem Child – Additional voices
ProStars – Additional voices
Quack Pack – Gwumpki
Rainbow Brite – Lurky, Buddy Blue, On-X, Evil Force
Raw Toonage – Additional voices
Red Planet – Willis
Richie Rich – Dollar the Dog
Robotix – Exeter Galaxon, Nomo
Saber Rider and the Star Sheriffs – Fireball
Saturday Supercade – Bingo
Secret Mountain Fort Awesome – Additional voices
Scooby-Doo and Scrappy-Doo – Tiger Morris, Policeman
Shadow Strikers – Chameleon Man
Snorks – Additional voices
Sonic the Hedgehog (SatAM) – Additional voices
Space Cats – Sniff
Spider-Man and His Amazing Friends – Gamesman
Stuart Little – Falcon
Super Friends – Additional voices
Super Friends: The Legendary Super Powers Show – Additional voices
TaleSpin – Wildcat
Teenage Mutant Ninja Turtles – Krang, Burne Thompson, Baxter Stockman, Casey Jones, Slash, Baby Shredder (1989 episode), Additional voices
Teenage Mutant Ninja Turtles – 80s Krang
The Addams Family – Cousin Itt
The Amazing Adventures of Spider-Man – Hobgoblin
The Angry Beavers – Additional voices
The Adventures of the American Rabbit – Tini Meeny
The Centurions – Max Ray, Dr. Wu
The Dukes – Additional voices
The Fairly OddParents – Lance Thruster
The Flintstone Kids – Additional voices
The Further Adventures of SuperTed – Spottyman (US dub)
The Glo Friends – Glo Worm
The Grim Adventures of Billy & Mandy – Squirrel, Cop, Schlub #1, Jeeves, Lil Porkchop, Announcer, Wiggy Jiggy Jed, Dr. Fear, Clortho, Sock Boy
The Incredible Hulk – Major Ned Talbot, Additional voices
The Jetsons – Skyhawk Mike, additional voices
The Legend of Korra – Gombo
The Legend of Prince Valiant – Additional voices
The Little Mermaid – Villain #2
The Littles – Slick the Turtle
The Moo Family – Chuck Steaker, Robin Hoof
The New Adventures of Zorro – Don Alejandro
The New Scooby and Scrappy-Doo Show – Additional voices
The New Yogi Bear Show – Additional voices
The Richie Rich/Scooby-Doo Show – Additional voices
The Scooby & Scrappy-Doo/Puppy Hour – Additional voices
The Secret Files of the Spy Dogs – Witchdoctor Clad
The Smurfs – Tuffy Smurf
The Super Hero Squad Show – Beta Ray Bill
The Mask: The Animated Series – Additional voices
The Tick – Additional voices
The Twisted Tales of Felix the Cat – Additional voices
The Tom and Jerry Kids Show – Kyle the Cat
The What-A-Cartoon! Show – Mad Bomber
The Wizard of Oz – Truckle
The Woody Woodpecker Show (1999) – Kid, Nash
The World's Greatest Super Friends – Additional voices
Time Squad – Kublai Khan
Timon and Pumbaa – Wolverine, Jumbo Jumbo
Tiny Toon Adventures – Travel Agent, Pen Pal, French Spoon
Toy Story Treats – Buzz Lightyear
Turbo Teen – Dr. Chase, Eddie
Twinkle, the Dream Being – Urg, Wishball
Vytor: The Starfire Champion – Windchaser, Air Mutoid Warrior, Land Mutoid Warrior
What-a-Mess – Arnold
Where's Waldo? – Additional voices
Widget the World Watcher – Additional voices
Wild West C.O.W.-Boys of Moo Mesa – Marshall Moo Montana
Wing Commander Academy – Additional voices
WWE Slam City – The Finisher (uncredited)
X-Men: Pryde of the X-Men – Pyro
Yo Yogi! – Additional voices

Video games

Aion – Additional voices
Aladdin in Nasira's Revenge – Additional voices
Animated Storybook: Toy Story – Buzz Lightyear
Arcania: Gothic 4 – Various
Armed and Dangerous – Captain 1, Indian Peasant, Q, Russian Captain
Atlantis The Lost Empire: Search for the Journal – Additional voices
Bloodrayne 2 – House Mom
Bubsy – Arnold Armadillo, Virgil Reality
Carmen Sandiego Math Detective – Chase Devineaux
Carmen Sandiego's ThinkQuick Challenge – Chase Devineaux
Carmen Sandiego Word Detective – Chase Devineaux
Command & Conquer 3: Kane's Wrath – Additional voices
Disney's Hades Challenge – Additional voices
Dragon Age: Origins – Beraht, Master Wade, Loilinar Ivo, Lord Bemot, Orzammar Royal Guard, Tapster's Patron, Bounty Hunter, Alienage Elf Man
Dragon Age: Origins – Awakening – Master Wade, additional voices
Dungeon Siege III – Meister Sigismund Wulf
Escape from Monkey Island – Additional voices
Evil Dead: A Fistful of Boomstick – Additional voices
Final Fantasy XIII – Cocoon Inhabitants
Forgotten Realms: Icewind Dale
Gladius – Additional voices
Gothic 3 – Additional voices
Herc's Adventures – Minotaur, Helldog, Soldier
Just Me and My Dad
Kinect Star Wars – Civilian
Kung Fu Panda: Legendary Warriors – Tai Lung
Lightning Returns: Final Fantasy XIII – Additional voices
Mickey Mouse Kindergarten - DJ, Cool Jazz Cat, Newyorker Guest #2, Squad Leader
Sacrifice – Additional voices
Spore – Additional voices
Skylanders: SuperChargers – Additional voices
Syar Wars: Jar Jar's Journey Adventure Book - Jawa, Snout Alien, Spacesuit Alien
Star Wars: Knights of the Old Republic – Dak Vesser, Gelrood, Republic Diplomat
Star Wars Rogue Squadron III: Rebel Strike – Jabba Guard, Officer 1, Owen, Rebel Trooper, Commando, Commander 1
Terminator 3: Rise of the Machines – Additional voices
The Hardy Boys: The Hidden Theft – Thomas, Orin, TV Voice
The Haunted Mansion – Ghost
Toy Story – Buzz Lightyear
Toy Story: Activity Center – Buzz Lightyear
Toy Story 2: Activity Center – Buzz Lightyear
Toy Story Racer – Rocky Gibraltar
Yoga Wii – Yoga Instructor

Live-action

I Am Legend – President (voice)
The Fisher King – Radio Show Call-In (voice)
The High Crusade – Chief Alien (voice)
'Til Death – Mr. Harris, Poseidon (voice)

Web series
Hanazuki: Full of Treasures – Doughy Bunington

Theme parks

Amazing Adventures of Spider-Man – Hobgoblin
Buzz Lightyear's Space Ranger Spin – Buzz Lightyear
Buzz Lightyear's Astro Blasters – Buzz Lightyear

Live shows
Disney on Ice – Buzz Lightyear (voice)

References

External links
 
 
 

1949 births
Living people
American male voice actors
American male video game actors
20th-century American male actors
21st-century American male actors
Former Latter Day Saints
Cornell University alumni
American Christians
Converts to Christianity